Kapisa, Kapiśa, Kapiśi, Kapesa or Kapissa may refer to:
 modern Kapisa Province of Afghanistan
 the 1st millennium Kingdom of Kapisa
 the city of Kapisi (or Kapisa), located near modern Bagram